Grigori Pavlovich Morozov (born 6 June 1994) is a Russian footballer who plays as a defender for Beitar Jerusalem, on loan from Celje. His primary position is left-back, but can also play at right-back.

Club career
Morozov made his debut in the Russian Second Division for Akademiya Tolyatti on 18 April 2012 in a game against Khimik Dzerzhinsk.

He made his Russian Football Premier League debut for Dynamo Moscow on 2 August 2015 in a game against Lokomotiv Moscow, and scored on his debut in a 1–1 draw. In his third game for Dynamo, on 16 August 2015, he scored the only goal in a 1–0 home victory over Ural Sverdlovsk Oblast.

On 24 June 2019, he signed a new three-year contract with Dynamo.

On 17 October 2020, he was loaned to Ufa for the 2020–21 season. Upon his return from Ufa, he did not train with the main squad and started the 2021–22 season with the reserves. On 6 February 2022, Morozov's contract with Dynamo was terminated by mutual consent.

On 14 February 2022, Morozov signed a two-and-a-half-year contract with Slovenian PrvaLiga side Celje.

On 31 December 2022, he was loaned for the rest of the season to Israeli Premier League side Beitar Jerusalem.

Personal life
Morozov has Jewish roots and received an Israeli passport in December 2022.

Career statistics

References

External links
 
 

1994 births
Living people
Sportspeople from Izhevsk
Russian footballers
Russian expatriate footballers
Association football fullbacks
FC Dynamo Moscow players
FC Ufa players
NK Celje players
Beitar Jerusalem F.C. players
Russian Premier League players
Russian First League players
Russian Second League players
Slovenian PrvaLiga players

Russia youth international footballers
Russia under-21 international footballers
Russian expatriate sportspeople in Slovenia
Expatriate footballers in Slovenia
Russian expatriate sportspeople in Israel
Expatriate footballers in Israel
Jewish footballers
Jewish Russian sportspeople